David L. Green (October 14, 1951 – July 25, 2014) was an American politician.

Born in Rosetta, Mississippi, Green received his associate degree from Southwest Mississippi Community College and was a retail merchant. He was also a deputy sheriff and police officer. He lived in Gloster, Mississippi. Green served in the Mississippi House of Representatives from 1979 until 2005. He died in Gloster, Mississippi.

Notes

1951 births
2014 deaths
People from Gloster, Mississippi
People from Wilkinson County, Mississippi
Southwest Mississippi Community College alumni
Businesspeople from Mississippi
Members of the Mississippi House of Representatives
20th-century American businesspeople
 American police officers